Zilog Encore! 32 is an ARM9-based microcontroller by Zilog, Inc. It was the company's second attempt to produce ARM-based controllers.

This system-on-a-chip includes an integrated memory controller, interfaces such as Universal Serial Bus (USB), liquid crystal display (LCD) and Serial Peripheral Interface Bus (SPI).

Variants include version supporting magnetic stripe reader or smart card reader.

Toolkit also includes Linux support.

Specifications
External Bus Interface: dual
SPI: 2
UARTs: 3
USB version: 2.0 On-The-Go
DMA Channels: 8
10-Bit ADC Channels
Timers/counters: 9
LCD Interface: monochrome
SRAM: 64KiB
Core speed: 200 MHz

External links
Zilog page
Zilog Introduces Encore! 32 Series Microcontroller for Control, Connectivity and Security Embedded Applications
Z80 inventor Zilog embraces ARM9, Linux

ARM-based microcontrollers